The Fritz J. and Dolores H. Russ Prize is an American national and international award established by the United States National Academy of Engineering (NAE) in October 1999 in Athens. Named after Fritz Russ, the founder of Systems Research Laboratories, and his wife Dolores Russ, it recognizes a bioengineering achievement that "has had a significant impact on society and has contributed to the advancement of the human condition through widespread use". The award was instigated at the request of Ohio University to honor Fritz Russ, one of its alumni.

The first Russ Prize was awarded in 2001 to Earl E. Bakken and Wilson Greatbatch. The prize is awarded biennially in odd years. From 2003-2011 there was a single winner per award.  Multiple winners were recognized starting in 2013. The first non-Americans to receive the Russ Prize were three of the five co-winners honored in 2015.

Only living persons may receive the prize, and recipients of the Charles Stark Draper Prize are not also eligible for the Russ Prize. Members of the NAE and non-members worldwide are able to receive the award.

The winners are announced during National Engineers Week in February. They receive US$500,000, a gold medallion and a hand-scribed certificate. The Russ Prize, the Gordon Prize and the Draper Prize, all awarded by the NAE, are known collectively as the "Nobel Prizes of Engineering".

Recipients

See also

 List of engineering awards

References

International awards
Awards of the United States National Academy of Engineering
Awards established in 1999
Biological engineering
Engineering awards
1999 establishments in the United States